Ramanand Swami (born Rama Sharma) to a Brahmin family in Ayodhya in Vikram Samvat 1795 (1738 AD). His parents were Ajay Sharma (father) and Sumati (mother). He was considered to be the incarnation of Uddhava, a close friend of Krishna.  Ramanand was the founder and head of the Uddhav Sampraday. Ramanand Swami adopted the Vishishtadvaita doctrine of the Vaishnava which was first propounded by Ramanuja several centuries earlier.  In his travels to Srirangam in southern India in his early life, Ramanand Swami said that Ramanuja gave him diksha (initiation) in a dream and appointed him in his line as an acharya.  Ramanand Swami then travelled West to Saurastra to spread the philosophy of Ramanuja.  Before dying in 1858, Ramanand Swami passed the reins of the Uddhav Sampraday to Swaminarayan.

Swaminarayan and initiation

Ramanand Swami was the guru of Swaminarayan.

Swaminarayan (then Ghanshyam Pande) left his home at age 11 on 28 June 1792 after the death of both his parents. He began a journey across India that took 7 years 1 month and 11 days. He took the name Nilkanth Varni while on his journey.  Nilkanth Varni traveled across India and parts of Nepal in search of an ashram or sampradaya that practiced what he considered a correct understanding of Vedanta, Samkhya, Yoga, and Pancaratra (the four primary schools of Hinduism).

To find an ashram that correctly practiced the meaning of these four primary schools of Hinduism, he asked the following five questions on the basic Vaishnava Vedanta categories:

 What is ?
 What is ?
 What is ?
 What is ?
 What is ?

While on his journey, Nilkanth Varni mastered ashtanga yoga or eightfold yoga. In the year 1799, Nilkanth Varni's journey as a yogi eventually concluded in Loj, a village in the Junagadh district of Gujarat. In Loj, Nilkanth Varni was introduced to Muktanand Swami, a senior disciple of Ramanand Swami who answered the five questions satisfactorily. He then persuaded Nilkanth Varni to stay to get an opportunity to meet Ramanand Swami, whose disciple Nilkanth Varni later became.

References 
Footnotes

Bibliography

Swaminarayan Sampradaya
1738 births
18th-century Hindu religious leaders
Vaishnava saints
Scholars from Uttar Pradesh
1802 deaths